The East Gloucestershire Championships also called the Cheltenham Lawn Tennis Championships was a combined men's and women's tennis tournament held from 1879 through 1969.

History
The East Gloucestershire Championships was played at the Cheltenham Lawn Tennis Club, Cheltenham, Great Britain the tournament was initially played on indoor hard courts (partially covered) from 1879 to 1881 then switched to outdoor grass courts there were fifty five editions of the event.

Past tournaments
Incomplete list of tournaments included:

Men's singles

References

Grass court tennis tournaments
Hard court tennis tournaments
Defunct tennis tournaments in the United Kingdom
Tennis tournaments in England